A Passionate Woman is a British two-part drama mini-series that aired on BBC One from 11 to 18 April 2010.

Plot
In 1950s Yorkshire, Betty Stevenson, a married mother of one, falls in love with her Polish neighbour, Alex Crazenovski aka "Craze."  The two begin an affair and Craze sends a letter to Betty asking her to run away with him. She responds in kind and her letter is found by Craze's pregnant wife, who promptly seeks him out at the fairground where he works and shoots him dead. With her lover dead, Betty continues her life with husband Donald and baby Mark.

The story then moves forward to the 1980s as Mark gets married and her affair becomes public knowledge.

Inspiration
Kay Mellor was inspired to write the story after her own mother confessed to having an affair with a Polish neighbour in the 1950s when living in a poorer area of Leeds. Just like the story, the unnamed Pole was killed which ended her mother's affair which she had kept secret for 30 years before revealing all. Mellor explained that with her mother being dead for three years, it was a way of bringing her back to life.

The work was originally a play that had first been performed at the West Yorkshire Playhouse in 1992 before moving on to the West End. Mellor admitted that the film rights had been mooted but she feared the production would end up with '...Cher on a roof-top in Detroit.'

Filming locations
Screen Yorkshire invested £250,000 in the programme and supplied crew for the filming locations. External scenes were filmed at Roundhay Park, Hyde Terrace, Hyde Park Cinema, Blenheim Square and the City Centre Market in Leeds. Additional filming was done at Bradford City Hall, St Luke's Hospital, and King's Hall and Winter Gardens in Bradford. Other parts were also recorded at Studio 81 in Leeds.

Episodes

References

External links
 
 

2010 British television series debuts
2010 British television series endings
2010s British drama television series
BBC television dramas
BBC high definition shows
2010s British television miniseries
Television shows set in West Yorkshire
English-language television shows
Television series set in the 1950s
Television series set in the 1980s